The YaM-5 (anti-tank mine 5 kilograms) was a Soviet anti-tank blast mine with a wood case. Various wood was used. The mine consists of a rectangular wooden box with a hinged lid that overlaps the front of the mine. A slot in the hinged lid's side through which an MUV pull fuse is placed. A wooden pressure bar is sometimes used on the edge of the lid above the slot. A nail is placed horizontally through the loop of the MUV fuse's striker retaining pin and two loops on the bottom of the lid's slot. 

A YaM-10 was also produced; it was a scaled-up version of the YaM-5. 

The wooden case was normally painted olive green, gray or white. 

The mine was frequently used with anti-handling devices.

Downward pressure on the lid forced the nail downwards; withdrawing the striker retaining pin detonated the mine.

Specifications

References

 TM 5-223, Foreign Mine Warfare Equipment
 Pamphlet No. 30-50-1, Handbook on the Soviet Army

External links

Anti-tank mines

Land mines of the Soviet Union